Pixar Short Films Collection, Volume 3 is a 2018 DVD and Blu-ray compilation of the Pixar animated short films following the 2007 Pixar Short Films Collection Volume 1 and the 2012 Pixar Short Films Collection Volume 2. It features 13 shorts that were released from 2012 through 2018. Volume 3 was released on November 9, 2018, by Walt Disney Studios Home Entertainment.

Main Shorts

References

External links

Short film compilations
Disney home video releases
Pixar short films
2010s English-language films
2010s American films